Fobes Hill is an unincorporated community and a census-designated place (CDP) in Snohomish County, Washington, United States. The population was 2,418 at the 2010 census. Fobes Hill is a middle class residential community located along Fobes Road, northwest of the city of Snohomish.

Geography 
Fobes Hill is located at  (47.939220, -122.134076).

According to the United States Census Bureau, the CDP has a total area of 4.655 square miles (12.06 km), all of it land.

References

External links 
 Ridge at Fobes Hill housing development

Census-designated places in Snohomish County, Washington
Census-designated places in Washington (state)